James C. Faris is an American anthropologist and epistemologist. He obtained his PhD in Cambridge in 1966 and joined the faculty of the University of Connecticut in 1969 as associate professor of anthropology. After retirement he moved to New Mexico. As an anthropologist he has published work on communities in Newfoundland, Sudan, and the Southwestern United States.

Books
Cat Harbour: A Newfoundland Fishing Settlement. 1966. Revised second edition, 1972.
Some Aspects of Clanship & Descent amongst the Nuba of South-Eastern Kordofan. 1968.
Nuba Personal Art. 1972.
Visual Rhetoric: Navajo Art and Curing.
Southeast Nuba Social Relations. 1989.
The Nightway: A History and a History of Documentation of a Navajo Ceremonial. 1990.
The Navajo and Photography: A Critical History of the Representation of an American People. 1996.

References

Living people
Alumni of the University of Cambridge
American anthropologists
Year of birth missing (living people)